Martin Doyle VC, MM (25 October 1891 – 20 November  1940) was an Irish member of the British Army during the First World War, and a recipient of the Victoria Cross, the highest and most prestigious award for gallantry in the face of the enemy that can be awarded to British and Commonwealth forces.

After the war, he joined the Irish Republican Army during the Irish War of Independence, served with the National Army during the Irish Civil War, in the Defence Forces until 1937 and Reserve Defence Forces until 1939.

World War I
Doyle was born in New Ross, County Wexford on 25 October 1891. He initially joined the Royal Irish Regiment in 1909 being given the Service Number 9962. He was transferred to the Royal Dublin Fusiliers in August 1914. After service with the Royal Dublin Fusiliers he joined The Royal Munster Fusiliers and was awarded the Military Medal

In September 1918 as  a company sergeant-major in the 1st Battalion, The Royal Munster Fusiliers, 16th (Irish) Division during the First World War when the following deed took place for which he was awarded the VC:

IRA service
In 1920, Doyle joined the Irish Republican Army and fought in the Irish War of Independence. He served with the pro-treaty National Army in the Irish Civil War, and retired in 1937.  Some sources have described Doyle as acting as an intelligence officer for the IRA in east County Clare.

He died in Dublin in 1940 from poliomyelitis, aged 49, and is buried in Grangegorman Military Cemetery.

References

Sources 
 The Register of the Victoria Cross (1981, 1988 and 1997)
 
 Ireland's VCs (Dept. of Economic Development 1995)
 Monuments to Courage (David Harvey, 1999)
 Irish Winners of the Victoria Cross (Richard Doherty & David Truesdale, 2000)

External links
Location of grave and VC medal

Department of the Taoiseach: Irish Soldiers in the First World War

1891 births
1940 deaths
Military personnel from County Wexford
National Army (Ireland) officers
Royal Munster Fusiliers soldiers
British Army personnel of World War I
Irish World War I recipients of the Victoria Cross
Recipients of the Military Medal
Irish Republican Army (1919–1922) members
People of the Irish Civil War (Pro-Treaty side)
Deaths from polio
People from County Wexford
Royal Irish Regiment (1684–1922) soldiers
Royal Dublin Fusiliers soldiers
British Army recipients of the Victoria Cross
Burials at Grangegorman Military Cemetery